Phuket United Futsal Club (Thai สโมสรฟุตซอลภูเก็ตยูไนเต็ด) is a Thai Futsal club.

Futsal clubs in Thailand
Futsal clubs established in 2006
2006 establishments in Thailand